This article lists the largest offshore wind farms that are currently operational rated by nameplate capacity. It also lists the largest offshore wind farms currently under construction, the largest proposed offshore wind farms, and offshore wind farms with notability other than size.

As of 2022, Hornsea 2 in the United Kingdom is the largest offshore wind farm in the world at 1,386 MW.

Largest operational offshore wind farms 

This is a list of offshore wind farms with at least 300 MW nameplate capacity that are currently operational.

Largest under construction 
This is a list of wind farms with a nameplate capacity of more than 300MW currently under construction.

Largest proposed 

The following table lists largest offshore wind farm areas (by nameplate capacity) that are only at a proposal stage, and have achieved at least some of the formal consents required before construction can begin.

Other notable offshore wind farms

See also 

 Jackup rig
 List of largest wind farms in the world
 Lists of offshore wind farms by country
 Lists of offshore wind farms by water area
 Wind power by country

References

External links 

 4C Offshore's Global Offshore Wind Farm Map and Database 
 North American Offshore Wind Project List 
 The Crown Estate's interactive UK marine estates map
 LORC Knowledge - Offshore Renewables Map
 Offshore Center List of offshore wind farms
 Renewable UK offshore wind page
 Tethys Map Viewer A compilation of documents, U.S. permitting sites, and international Annex IV project sites and research studies on offshore wind developments that are associated with a geographic location.

 
Wind farms (Offshore)
Offshore
Renewable energy commercialization